Zawlnuam is a census town in Mamit district in the Indian state of Mizoram.

Demographics
Zawlnuam is a Notified Town city in district of Mamit, Mizoram. The Zawlnuam city is divided into 4 wards for which elections are held every 5 years. The Zawlnuam Notified Town has population of 3,733 of which 1,949 are males while 1,784 are females as per report released by Census India 2011.

Population of Children with age of 0-6 is 523 which is 14.01 % of total population of Zawlnuam (NT). In Zawlnuam Notified Town, Female Sex Ratio is of 915 against state average of 976. Moreover Child Sex Ratio in Zawlnuam is around 855 compared to Mizoram state average of 970. Literacy rate of Zawlnuam city is 88.97 % lower than state average of 91.33 %. In Zawlnuam, Male literacy is around 89.14 % while female literacy rate is 88.79 %.

Transport 
The Distance between Zawlnuam and Aizawl is 176 km and is connected with regular service of Maxicabs.

Education 
There is Zawlnuam College, under Mizoram University and a number of public and private schools. Zawlnuam Higher Secondary School. Presbyterian English School and Baptist English school, and others Government School etc.

References

Mamit
Cities and towns in Mamit district